Progonia kurosawai is a moth of the family Noctuidae first described by Owada in 1987. It is found in Japan, Sri Lanka, Taiwan, Nepal, Myanmar, Borneo and Sulawesi.

Forewings narrow and brownish with a darker border. Reniform kidney shaped. Dark, very fine, crenulate antemedial and postmedial lines present. Hindwings pale, straw coloured with a darker, dull brown border.

Gallery

References

External links
Kononenko, Vladimir S. & Pinratana, Amnuay (2013).Moths of Thailand: Volume III, Part 2, Noctuoidea

Moths of Asia
Moths described in 1987
Herminiinae